Kingsway is a cigarette brand, currently owned by conglomerated British American Tobacco, and manufactured by its subsidiary American Express of London/Ardath Tobacco Company. In Ireland, the brand was manufactured by W.D. & H.O. Wills, and in Malaysia, the brand is manufactured by Rothmans International.

History

Kingsway was launched in January 1959, and several advertising campaigns were launched in the 1960s for the brand to gain more popularity, like for example in Ireland.

Kingsway was a popular cigarette brand in the 1960s and 1970s, but eventually lost appeal and disappeared from the European market after the 1980s. In Asia, and especially in Malaysia, the brand is still popular and sold today. Their slogan was "Smoke the BIG way... the Modern way."

Various cigarette lighters, tin boxes and ashtrays of Kingsway were also sold.

Markets
The brand was or still is sold in the United Kingdom, Ireland, West Germany and Malaysia.

See also

 Tobacco smoking

References

British American Tobacco brands
Imperial Brands brands
1959 introductions